Interstate 85 Business or Business Interstate 85 may refer to the following Business Interstate Highways that connect to Interstate 85:

Interstate 85 Business (North Carolina), serving the Piedmont Triad area
Interstate 85 Business (South Carolina), serving the Spartanburg area

85 Business
85
Business